Alexandre Sidorenko (born 18 February 1988) is a French tennis player.

Sidorenko has a career-high ATP singles ranking of world No. 145, achieved on 25 May 2009. He also has a career-high ATP doubles ranking of world No. 168, achieved 7 June 2010.

Junior career
As a junior, Sidorenko reach as high a world No. 3 in the combined singles + doubles junior ranking system. Contributing most significantly to this ranking, was his title run in winning the 2006 Australian Open boys' singles. He defeated Australian Nick Lindahl in straight sets 6–3, 7–6(7–4) to capture the championship.

Career
Sidorenko made his ATP Tour singles main draw debut at the 2006 Open 13 on hard courts in Marseille, France. Having received a wild card granting him direct entry into the first round, he was defeated by Evgeny Korolev of Russia in three sets 6–2, 4–6, 1–6. He made his ATP Tour doubles debut at the same tournament, receiving a wild card into the doubles main draw as well alongside compatriot David Guez. They would lose in the first round to another French partnership in, Gaël Monfils and Paul-Henri Mathieu in three sets 3–6, 6–3, [6–10].

He lost in the first round of the 2007 French Open against Werner Eschauer as a wildcard, when he had to retire. In 2008, he lost to Younes El Aynaoui in the first round of the Munich Open in Germany.

Sidorenko has reached 16 career singles finals, posting a record of 5 wins and 11 losses which includes a 1–1 tally in ATP Challenger Tour finals. He won the 2016 Saint Brieuc Challenger tournament in France, defeating Igor Sijsling 2–6, 6–3, 7–6(7–3) in the final to claim the championship. Additionally, he has reached 25 career doubles finals, posting a record of 10 wins and 15 losses which included a 2–1 record in ATP Challenger Tour finals.

Performance timelines

Singles

Doubles

ATP Challenger and ITF Futures finals

Singles: 16 (5–11)

Doubles: 25 (10–15)

Junior Grand Slam finals

Singles: 1 (1 title)

References

External links
 
 
 

1988 births
Living people
Australian Open (tennis) junior champions
French expatriate sportspeople in Monaco
French male tennis players
French people of Russian descent
Naturalized citizens of France
People from Monte Carlo
Russian emigrants to France
Sportspeople from Saint Petersburg
People with acquired American citizenship
Grand Slam (tennis) champions in boys' singles